The Jewish Center is a Modern Orthodox synagogue on New York City's Upper West Side.

History
The synagogue was founded in 1918 by prosperous Jews moving into the Upper West Side of Manhattan, a neighborhood that was just being built along the new IRT subway line.  The large synagogue is in a tall Neo-Classical building at 131 West 86th Street that contains a large number of social halls, classrooms, auditoriums and offices in addition to the Neo-Classical main sanctuary. The synagogue was the first in America to be built not only to serve as spiritual home to its members, but also as a cultural, social and recreational home. The synagogue's members affectionately refer to the synagogue as "The first Shul with a Pool." It continues to support a variety of educational and social programming.

The first rabbi was Mordecai Kaplan, who left in 1921 because his positions were too reform oriented for the Orthodox congregation.  The congregation then hired Rabbi Dr. Leo Jung, who later became involved in the founding and support of almost every major Orthodox organization in the United States and abroad, including the Union of Orthodox Hebrew Congregations, Agudath Israel, Torah Umesorah, Bais Yaakov movement (in Poland and the United States) and Chabad. Rabbi Dr. Norman Lamm, later Chancellor at Yeshiva University, took over the pulpit in 1959. The fourth rabbi was Rabbi Isaac Bernstein, an Irish scholar. Rabbi Jacob J. Schacter was rabbi from 1981 to 2000, and now serves as Resident Scholar at The Center for the Jewish Future at Yeshiva University. Rabbi Dr. Ari Berman, founding rabbi of The Jewish Center Young Leadership minyan, and currently president of Yeshiva University, served as the sixth rabbi of the Center before making aliyah in 2008.

Present
The current rabbi is Yosie Levine, an alumnus of Columbia University and Rabbi Isaac Elchanan Theological Seminary.

References

External links
 http://www.jewishcenter.org/

Synagogues in Manhattan
Upper West Side
Modern Orthodox synagogues in the United States
Orthodox synagogues in New York City
Synagogues completed in 1918
1918 establishments in New York City
Neoclassical synagogues